This is a list of public art in the county of Herefordshire, England. This list applies only to works of public art on permanent display in an outdoor public space. For example, this does not include artworks in museums.

Bromyard and district

Golden Valley

Hereford

Kington and district

Ledbury and district

Leominster and district

Ross-on-Wye

Weobley

References 

Heref
Culture in Herefordshire
Public art